The 1996–97 season was Blackpool F.C.'s 89th season (86th consecutive) in the Football League. They competed in the 24-team Division Two, then the third tier of English league football, finishing seventh. 5 September 1996 marked the 100th anniversary of Blackpool's first match in the Football League.

Season summary
Sam Allardyce was fired after failing to bring the club promotion the previous season. He was replaced by the former Norwich City manager Gary Megson.

Tony Ellis was the club's top scorer for the third consecutive season, with eighteen goals (fifteen in the league and three in the League Cup).

Final league table

Results
Blackpool's score comes first

Legend

Football League Second Division

FA Cup

League Cup

Football League Trophy

Squad

References

Blackpool F.C.
Blackpool F.C. seasons